Mailam Engineering College, is a private engineering college, founded in 1998, in the Villupuram district, of Tamil Nadu, India. The college is approved by the All India Council for Technical Education in New Delhi and affiliated with Anna University, Chennai. The college is built in a campus of 42 acres, situated adjacent to the Sri Subramaniam Swamy Koil, Mailam, and Sri Vakkarakali Amman Koil, Thiruvakkarai.

Courses 
The college offers six undergraduate courses and six postgraduate courses including M.B.A. and M.C.A.

Undergraduate Departments

Post Graduate programs

Auditorium
The college is provided with a fully air-conditioned auditorium to accommodate 750 students.

References

External links 

Engineering colleges in Tamil Nadu
Colleges affiliated to Anna University
Education in Viluppuram district
Educational institutions established in 1998
1998 establishments in Tamil Nadu